Spiro Çomora (January 31, 1918 – April 16, 1973) was an Albanian playwright, famous mostly as a comedist (one who writes comedies). He is most known for the comedy Karnavalet e Korçës, which premiered in 1961 and earned him national fame. Çomora also wrote children's poetry and distinguished himself as a translator.

Biography
Spiro Çomora was born in Corfu, Greece, from a family hailing from Vuno, Himare, in the Albanian Riviera.

He died at age 55.

Career
Çomora's most famous comedy is Karnavalet e Korçës (Korçë's Carnivals) (1961).

Çomora also created poetry for children, as well as translated into Albanian works of Ancient Greece dramaturgs, such as The Odyssey of Homer and Lysistrata of Aristophanes. He is also known for his satirical articles in the magazine Hosteni.

Honors and awards
Çomora was posthumously given the title Honor of Himara in 2012.

Works
 Syfete
 Shkolla jonë (Our School)
 Nga fshati i gruas (From My Wife's Village)
 Syleshi (The Stupid)
 Skena e prapaskena (Stages and Backstage)
 Karnavalet e Korçës (Korçë's Carnivals)

Translations
  (from Ancient Greek)
  (from Ancient Greek)

References

Albanian dramatists and playwrights
Albanian translators
Greek–Albanian translators
Albanian children's writers
Writers from Corfu
People from Himara
1918 births
1973 deaths
20th-century translators
20th-century dramatists and playwrights
20th-century Albanian writers
Albanian satirists